Sep. 18 - Eastern Orthodox liturgical calendar - Sep. 20

All fixed commemorations below celebrated on October 2 by Orthodox Churches on the Old Calendar.

For September 18th, Orthodox Churches on the Old Calendar commemorate the Saints listed on September 6.

Saints
 Martyrs Trophimus, Sabbatius, and Dorymedon of Synnada (276-282)  (see also: October 31)
 Martyr Zosimas, hermit of Cilicia (4th century)

Pre-Schism Western saints
 Saint Felix and Constantia, martyrs under Nero in Nocera near Naples, in Italy (1st century)
 Hieromartyrs Januarius, Bishop of Benevento, and his companions, at Pozzuoli (305):  (see also: April 21 - East)
 Festus, Proclus, and Sossius, Deacons; 
 Martyrs Desiderius, Reader, and Gantiol, Eutychius, and Acutius.
 Saint Eustochius, successor of St Brice as Bishop of Tours in France (461)
 Saint Seguanos (Sequanus, Seine, Sigo), in the diocese of Langres in Gaul, Confessor (580)
 Saint Goeric (Abbo), successor of St Arnulf as Bishop of Metz in France (647)
 Saint Pomposa, a nun at Peñamelaria near Cordoba in Spain, beheaded by the Moors in Cordoba (853)
 Saint Theodore of Tarsus, Archbishop of Canterbury (690)

Post-Schism Orthodox saints
 Blessed Igor (George), tonsured Gabriel, great prince of Chernigov and Kiev (1147)
 Blessed Prince Theodore of Smolensk and Yaroslavl (1299) and his children Saints David (1321) and Constantine (c. 1322)

New martyrs and confessors
 New Hieromartyr Constantine (Golubev), Priest, of Bogorodsk, and two martyrs with him (1918)  (see also: November 7 - Uncovering)
 New Hieromartyr Nicholas Iskrovsky, Protopresbyter (1919)
 Venerable Alexis, Hiero-Schemamonk of Zosima Hermitage (1928)
 New Hieromartyr Constantine Bogoslovsky, Priest (1937)
 New Martyr Nilus Smirnov, Priest (1938)
 Virgin-martyr Mary (Mamontova-Shashin), at Bamlag (1938)

Icon gallery

Notes

References

Sources
 September 19/October 2. Orthodox Calendar (PRAVOSLAVIE.RU).
 October 2 / September 19. HOLY TRINITY RUSSIAN ORTHODOX CHURCH (A parish of the Patriarchate of Moscow).
 September 19. OCA - The Lives of the Saints.
 The Autonomous Orthodox Metropolia of Western Europe and the Americas (ROCOR). St. Hilarion Calendar of Saints for the year of our Lord 2004. St. Hilarion Press (Austin, TX). p. 70.
 The Nineteenth Day of the Month of September. Orthodoxy in China.
 September 19. Latin Saints of the Orthodox Patriarchate of Rome.
 The Roman Martyrology. Transl. by the Archbishop of Baltimore. Last Edition, According to the Copy Printed at Rome in 1914. Revised Edition, with the Imprimatur of His Eminence Cardinal Gibbons. Baltimore: John Murphy Company, 1916. pp. 289–290.
 Rev. Richard Stanton. A Menology of England and Wales, or, Brief Memorials of the Ancient British and English Saints Arranged According to the Calendar, Together with the Martyrs of the 16th and 17th Centuries. London: Burns & Oates, 1892. pp. 452–454.

 Greek Sources
 Great Synaxaristes:  19 ΣΕΠΤΕΜΒΡΙΟΥ. ΜΕΓΑΣ ΣΥΝΑΞΑΡΙΣΤΗΣ.
  Συναξαριστής. 19 Σεπτεμβρίου. ECCLESIA.GR. (H ΕΚΚΛΗΣΙΑ ΤΗΣ ΕΛΛΑΔΟΣ).
  19/09/. Ορθόδοξος Συναξαριστής.

 Russian Sources
  2 октября (19 сентября). Православная Энциклопедия под редакцией Патриарха Московского и всея Руси Кирилла (электронная версия). (Orthodox Encyclopedia - Pravenc.ru).
  19 сентября по старому стилю / 2 октября по новому стилю. Русская Православная Церковь - Православный церковный календарь на  год.

September in the Eastern Orthodox calendar